The Conway Farms Golf Club is a private golf club in the central United States, located in west Lake Forest, Illinois, a suburb north of Chicago. Designed by Tom Fazio, the course opened for play  in 1991 and is notable for having hosted numerous amateur championship tournaments since 1997 as well as the PGA Tour's BMW Championship in 2013, 2015, and 2017, part of the season-ending FedEx Cup playoffs in September.

Luke Donald held the course record of 61 at Conway Farms for almost five years until 2013, when Jim Furyk shot a 59 during the second round of the BMW Championship on September 13; it was the sixth 59 in tour history.

Course

Notable Members 
Luke Donald
Olin Kreutz
Dale Tallon
Matt Nagy
Diane Offereins
Nick Kokonas

Notable Employees 

 Bruce Moore
 Eduardo Bonifacio Garcia

References

External links

Golflink.com web page

Golf clubs and courses in Illinois